The Family is an Australian fly-on-the-wall documentary series that began airing 24 November 2011 on SBS One. It is the Australian version of the British series of the same name.

The first series will follow the Cardamone family—father Angelo, mother Josephine, and sons David (20), Stefan (18), and Adrian (14)--through their daily lives. They have allowed 35 remote-controlled cameras to follow their every move, day and night, for three months.

The Families

Series 1: The Cardamones
Series 1 follows the lives of the Cardamone family—parents Angelo and Josephine and sons David (20), Stefan (18), and Adrian (14)--who live in the Melbourne suburb of Park Orchards.

Angelo Cardamone works for a concrete company and is a quiet man who lets his wife Josephine run the house. When Angelo feels strongly about something, he will definitely put his foot down and is the stricter parent. Angelo describes himself as content and looks forward to seeing his boys mature and start their own lives.
Josephine 'Josie' Cardamone runs a very efficient household, providing a home for her husband and three boys. The large amount of cooking, cleaning and caring doesn't get her down. Josephine, while keeping up with her duties of running the house, is also a part-time cosmetics salesperson in Myer, which adds to her load. Josephine looks forward to having daughters-in-law and hopes to make a great mother-in-law one day.
David Cardamone (20) is Angelo and Josephine's eldest son. He studies architecture and works part-time. He also plays football and has a steady girlfriend, Jess. He fights with his brothers when he feels they do not pull their own weight. David's biggest frustration is that he and Jess aren't allowed to share a bedroom when she stays over.
Stefan Cardamone (18) is Angelo and Josephine's middle son. He tends to not feel the pressure of expectation that his older brother David does, and he escapes the attention that younger brother Adrian gets. He is very creative and loves '80s music. Stefan also plays the guitar and likes football and is the most laid-back of the 3 boys. He's in Year 12 and has a big decision to make about his future and whether he will attend university, take on a trade, or take a year off to travel.
Adrian Cardamone (14) is Angelo and Josephine's youngest son. The most self-confident of the boys, he likes to act as the family commentator. He doesn't like arguments and usually retreats to the piano when he's angry. Adrian has a very open relationship with his father Angelo and is quite thoughtful. He also likes to have friends over and is hoping to find a girlfriend soon.

References 

Special Broadcasting Service original programming
2011 Australian television series debuts
English-language television shows
Television series about families